Anthony David Leon (February 18, 1917 in Follansbee, West VirginiaJuly 19, 2002) was a professional American football offensive lineman in the National Football League for the Washington Redskins, the Brooklyn Tigers, and the Boston Yanks.  He played college football at the University of Alabama and was drafted in the eighth round of the 1943 NFL Draft.

1917 births
2002 deaths
People from Follansbee, West Virginia
Players of American football from West Virginia
Alabama Crimson Tide football players
American football offensive guards
Washington Redskins players
Brooklyn Tigers players
Boston Yanks players